Géraldine Martineau is a French actress, originally from Nantes, France. She started acting when she was 8 years old. At the age of 17, she was accepted into the Cours Florent and started a course in the Classe Libre (a free 2-year acting course), before she entered the Conservatoire National Supérieur d’Art Dramatique two years later. She has acted on stage, on television and in movies.

Filmography
 2007 – Hellphone directed by James Huth : Charlotte
 2008 – Musée haut, musée bas : directed by Jean-Michel Ribes : Girl in green checkered dress
 2009 – La Fonte des neiges (short directed by Jean-Julien Chervier): Antoinette
 2010 – Blanche, short directed by Pierre Mazingarbe : Blanche
 2010 – Aglaée (short) by Rudi Rosenberg : Aglaée
 2010 – La Commanderie, (TV series, episodes " Jeu de dupes " and " L'Arrivée du duc d'Anjou ") directed by Didier Le Pêcheur : Flora
 2011 – Léa, directed by Bruno Rolland : Alice
 2011 – Les poissons préfèrent l'eau du bain (short) by Pierre Mazingarbe : Sarah
 2011 – La vie secrète des jeunes, directed by Riad Sattouf
 2012 – Le Guetteur, directed by Michele Placido" : Sonia
 2015 – Le nouveau by Rudi Rosenberg : Aglaée
 2017 – Marie-Francine, directed by Valérie Lemercier : Anaïs
 2017 – Bloody Milk, directed by Hubert Charuel : Emma
 2018 – Sur un Airbnb, by Zazon Castro : Rita
 2018 – Les secrets, (TV série) directed by Christophe Lamotte : Justine
 2018 – Le Poulain, directed by Mathieu Sapin : Geraldine 
 2018 – Le temps des égarés ( TV movie) directed by Virginie Sauveur : Audrey

References

External links
 

1985 births
Living people
Actors from Nantes
French film actresses
French television actresses
21st-century French actresses
French stage actresses
French National Academy of Dramatic Arts alumni
Cours Florent alumni